Emmett Skilton (born 23 September 1987) is a New Zealand actor and director.

He played the lead character, Axl Johnson, in the comedy-drama, The Almighty Johnsons, and most recently had roles in Avatar: The Way of Water and American comedy series Young Rock, portraying Dwayne Johnson's real-life college football coach, Ed Orgeron.

Early life 
Emmett was born in Wellington, New Zealand. He grew up in Titahi Bay and attended Mana College, all in his home town of Titahi Bay. Emmett performed in the New Zealand Sheilah Winn Shakespeare Festival every year that he was at Mana College, and one year directed A Midsummer Night's Dream. In 2005 he was selected to attend the New Zealand Schools Shakespeare Production.

During high school, Emmett performed with improvisation troupe, Joe Improv, at Wellington's Capital E. New Zealand director Danny Mulheron saw Emmett perform and asked him to audition for the role of Willem in Seven Periods with Mr Gormsby. The following year he toured New Zealand and Sydney with the acting company The Ugly Shakespeare Company, before attending Toi Whakaari: New Zealand Drama School, in 2007.

Career

Film and Television 
While studying at Toi Whakaari, Emmett starred in the feature film Home By Christmas, based on Gaylene Preston's family during WW2. He graduated at the end of 2009 with a Bachelor of Performing Arts in Acting and began starring as Axl Johnson in The Almighty Johnsons from 2010.

Emmett played real-life figures Sam Giancana in US series The Making of the Mob: Chicago in 2016 and Victor Lownes in American Playboy: The Hugh Hefner Story in 2017. He went on to star in James Cameron's Avatar: The Way of Water, The Sounds, New Zealand and Canadian co-production, Together Forever Tea, Amazon Prime's American Playboy: The Hugh Hefner Story,.

Most recently, Emmett stars in NBC's new single-camera comedy series, Young Rock, based on the life of Dwayne Johnson. Emmett portrays Johnson's former position coach at the University of Miami, former LSU head coach, Ed Orgeron.

Directing 
From 2015 to 2017, Emmett produced and directed the comedy web series Auckward Love which centers around a young heartbroken girl in Auckland, New Zealand, in her quest to find love again from her not-so-useful best friends. He also directed the award-winning comedy series, Millennial Jenny, exclusively for Instagram TV in 2019 to present. 
Emmett co-directed Stan Harrington's Australian series, Legends, released in 2019.

He is a screen tutor at leading drama school The Actors Program and directed their 2017 and 2018 graduation films, Ripple and 13 Suspects, the latter written by The Almighty Johnsons co-creator Rachel Lang.

Most recently, Emmett has directed over 100 episodes of Shortland Street for TVNZ.

Filmography

Film 
 Together Forever Tea (2021) Steve Slater
 Ablaze (2020) David Cody
 Shortland Street (2020) Ross Douglas
 James Patterson's Murder Is Forever (2018) Det. Derek Mois
 Into The Rainbow (2017) Tom Williams
 Every Little Thing (2016) Henry Thorougood
 Bella (2016) Connor Gregor
 The Last Train (2015) Louis
 We Feel Fine  (2012) Roger
 Packed (2011) Darth Vader
 Shopping for One (2010) Dave
 Home By Christmas (2009) Tiny

Television 
 Young Rock (2021) Coach Orgeron
 The Sounds (2020) Brendan
 Kino Ratten (2019) Officer Armand
 Power Rangers Beast Morphers (2019) Jax
 Power Rangers Super Ninja Steel (2018) Dreadwolf and Stabberous
 Dear Murderer (2017) Bruce Peterson
 American Playboy: The Hugh Hefner Story (2017) Victor Lownes
 The Brokenwood Mysteries (2017) Dr. Byron Cotter
 Power Rangers Dino Super Charge (2016) Professor Strickler
 The Making of the Mob: Chicago (2016) Sam Giancana
 Jono and Ben at Ten (2013) Guy Williams
 The Almighty Johnsons – Series 3 (2013) Axl Johnson
 Would I Lie To You? (2012) Himself
 The Almighty Johnsons – Series 2 (2012) Axl Johnson
 Aotearoa Film and Television Awards (2011) Himself
 The Almighty Johnsons – Series 1 (2011) Axl Johnson
 Time Trackers (2008) Ernest Rutherford
 The Investigator (2006) Brendan Easton
 Seven Periods with Mr Gormsby (2005) Willem van der Murren

Web 
 Millennial Jenny (2018-2020) Producer/Director
 Auckward Love (2015-2017) Producer/Director
  (2013) Axl Johnson

Theatre 
 Between Two Waves (2015) Daniel Wells
 Stones in His Pockets (2014) Various
 Tribes (2012) Daniel
 Idiots 3D (2011) Francis Fox
 Paper Sky: A Love Story (2011–12) Henry
 Gagarin Way (2010) Tom

Awards 
 Best Acting Ensemble – NZ Webfest 2020
 Alumni Award – NZ Webfest 2020
 Best Director of a series – Seal Beach Film Festival 2019
 Best Director of an International Web-series –  Melbourne Webfest 2016
 Best Screenplay for an International Web-series –  Melbourne Webfeet 2016
 Nomination for 'Rising Star' Award – TV Guide Best of the Box 2012

References

External links 
 
 Emmett Skilton at Johnson and Laird Management

1987 births
Living people
New Zealand male film actors
New Zealand male television actors
New Zealand male stage actors
New Zealand male voice actors
People educated at Mana College
People from Porirua
Male actors from Wellington City
Toi Whakaari alumni